The Spotnicks were an instrumental rock group from Sweden that formed in 1961. They were known for wearing "space suit" costumes on stage and for their innovative electronic guitar sound. They released 43 albums and sold more than 18 million records.

History
The Spotnicks originated from a duo, "The Rebels" (1956), formed by Bo Starander (11 March 1942 – 3 May 2020 rhythm guitar, vocals), and Björn Thelin (27 June 1942 – 24 January 2017; bass guitar).  They were joined by lead guitarist Bo Winberg  (born in Gothenburg, Sweden; 27 March 1939 – 3 January 2020), and became "Rock-Teddy and the Blue Caps" in 1957 in Gothenburg.  In 1958 they added Ove Johansson (drums) (30 March 1940 - 8 April 2017), changed their name to "The Frazers", and began playing regularly in local clubs. They signed a recording contract in 1961, and changed their name to "The Spotnicks", a play on the Russian satellite Sputnik as suggested by their manager, Roland Ferneborg.  Starander was later known as Bob Lander.

They soon became the first Swedish group to have significant international success, in a similar style to The Shadows and The Ventures. They toured Europe, and one of their early records, "Orange Blossom Special", became their first big international hit, making the Top 30 in the UK Singles Chart in 1962 on the Oriole label, and reaching No. 1 in Australia. Around this time they began wearing their trademark "space suits" on stage. They recorded their first album, The Spotnicks in London, Out-a Space, in 1962. Further hits included "Rocket Man" (based on the Soviet/Russian folk march "Polyushko-polye"), and "Hava Nagila" (their biggest UK hit, where it made No. 13). Winberg also recorded solo, credited as 'The Shy Ones'.

In 1963, "Amapola" became one of their most successful singles in their home country, staying at No. 1 in Sweden for eight weeks. They appeared in the film Just for Fun, continued to tour widely, and recorded their second album, The Spotnicks in Paris. That year, drummer Ove Johansson left and was replaced by an Englishman, Derek Skinner (born 5 March 1942, London). Two years later, Skinner was replaced briefly by Jimmie Nicol, who had drummed with The Beatles on the Danish, Dutch and Australian leg of their 1964 tour, while Ringo Starr recovered from having his tonsils removed.
		
In 1964 and 1965, The Spotnicks expanded their popularity in Germany and Japan, reaching No. 1 in Japan in 1966 with "Karelia". Elsewhere, however, they became less successful as popular music tastes changed. In 1965 the band was joined by organist, vocalist Peter Winsnes (born 9 March 1944, Molndal, Sweden). Nicol left in February 1967 and was replaced by Tommy Tausis (22 March 1946–30 March 2022). Thelin also left in 1967 and was replaced by Magnus Hellsberg (born 6 November 1944). Winsnes left in 1968 and organist Goran Samuelsson joined in 1969. The group, having undergone many personnel changes, split up in 1970 after releasing their fifteenth album, The Spotnicks Back in the Race. Yet the band was still popular in Japan, and it soon reformed under Winberg's control in 1971 at the request of a Japanese record label.

Winberg continued to lead versions of The Spotnicks, occasionally including Lander and/or Thelin, on tour and in recordings.  In 2013, Winberg and Lander announced that they would be undertaking a final tour, finishing in May 2014.  The Spotnicks played their very last concert on 30 March 2019, at Musikens Hus, Gothenburg. 

Johansson died on 8 April 2017. 

Winberg died on 3 January 2020. 

Lander died on 3 May 2020.  

Tausis died on 30 March 2022.

Discography

Albums

1962, Karusell KALP 1012 (Mono)/KALPS1012 (electronisk stereo/electronical stereo), The Spotnicks in London, Out-a Space (LP): re-released, 2014, on CD: Hallmark 715542.
1962, Karusell KSEP 3272 (Mono), The Spotnicks on the Air (EP)
1963, Karusell KALP 1014 (Mono)/KALPS1014 (Stereo), The Spotnicks in Paris, Dansons avec les Spotnicks (LP)
1963, SweDisc SWELP 1 (Mono) SWELPS1 (Stereo), The Spotnicks in Spain "Bailemos con los Spotnicks" (LP)
1963, President KVP 162, Devenez soliste des Spotnicks (LP)
1964, SweDisc SWELP 20 (Mono) SWELPS20 (Stereo), The Spotnicks in Stockholm (LP)
1964, SweDisc SWELP 22 (Mono), The Spotnicks in Berlin (LP)
1965, SweDisc SWELP 33 (Mono) SWELPS33 (Stereo), The Spotnicks at Home in Gothenburg (LP)
1966, SweDisc SWELP 38 (Mono) SWELPS38 (Stereo), The Spotnicks in Tokyo (LP)
1966, SweDisc SWELP C 42, The Spotnicks Around the World (LP)
1966, SweDisc SWELP C 48, The Spotnicks in Winterland (LP)
1967, Karusell KP 3001, The Spotnicks (LP)
1967, SweDisc SWELP C 53, The Spotnicks Live in Japan (LP)
1967, SweDisc SWLS 501, The Spotnicks (LP)
1967, SweDisc SWLS 502, The Spotnicks (LP)
1967, SweDisc SWELP C 54, Den Röda Brandbilen (LP)
1967, SweDisc SWELP C 60, The Spotnicks in Acapulco Mexico (LP)
1968, SweDisc SWELP C 63, The Spotnicks in the Groove (LP)
1968, SweDisc SWELP C 67, The Spotnicks By Request (LP)
1970, Polydor 2379 005, The Spotnicks "Back in the Race"(LP)
1971, Canyon Y-1005, The Spotnicks "Ame no ballad" (LP)
1972, Polydor 2379 032, The Spotnicks "Something Like Country" (LP)
1973, Karusell 2499 056, The Spotnicks in Japan (LP)
1973, Polydor 2379 060, Bo Winberg & The Spotnicks "Today" (LP)
1973, "Okänt bolag" MC 12 CPP 227, The Spotnicks Plays Great Hits of Japanese Tunes" (LP)
1974, Polydor 2480 201, The Spotnicks Live in Berlin '74 (LP)
1976, Polydor 2480 328, The Spotnicks "Feelings - 12 Brandnew Songs" (LP)
1977, Polydor 2310 568, The Spotnicks "Charttoppers Recorded 77" (LP)
1978, Marianne Records MILP 1300, The Spotnicks "The Great Snowman" (LP)
1978, Polydor 2344 116, The Spotnicks "Never Trust Robots" (LP)
1979, Marianne Records MILP 1304, The Spotnicks " Saturday Night Music" (LP)
1979, SweDisc SW25-6005, The Spotnicks "Pink Lady Super Hits" (LP)
1980, Polydor 2344 156, The Spotnicks "20th Anniversary Album" (LP)
1982, Mill Records MILL 5004, The Spotnicks "We Don't Wanna Play Amapola No More" (LP)
1983, Mill Records MILL 5019, The Spotnicks "In the Middle of Universe" (LP)
1985, Mill Records MILL 5028, The Spotnicks "Highway Boogie" (LP)
1986, Mill Records MILL 5036, The Spotnicks "In Time" (LP)
1987, Europa 100 423.9, The Spotnicks "Love Is Blue" (CD)
1987, Imtrat IMT CD 100.052, The Spotnicks "Happy Guitar" (CD)
1987, Koch Records H 321 859, The Spotnicks "16 Golden World Hits" (CD)
1989, Mill Records MILL 5040, MICD 5040, The Spotnicks "Unlimited" (LP),(CD)
1993, RCA/BMG 74321 12590 2, The Spotnicks/Bo Winberg #1 (CD)
1995, RCA/BMG 74321 26465 2, The Spotnicks "Tracks" (CD)
1997, Riverside Records RRCD 101, The Spotnicks 1997 (CD)
1999, WISTA & The Spotnicks Records TSRCD 001, The Spotnicks Live 1999 (CD)
2002, WISTA & The Spotnicks Records TSRCD 002, The Otherside (Of the Moon) (CD)
2003, WISTA TSRCD 003, Back to the Roots (CD)
2006, WISTA TSRCD 004, Still on Tour (CD)
2009, Riverside Records RRCD 130, Bo Winberg / My Own Favorites (CD)
2011, WISTA TSRCD 005 The 'Real' Amapola (CD)

Chart singles

References

External links
Official website
Discography
 

Swedish rock music groups
Musical groups established in 1961
Instrumental rock musical groups
Musical groups from Gothenburg
1961 establishments in Sweden